Yön (Turkish: Direction) was a weekly Turkish political magazine published between 1961 and 1967. It was a Kemalist and leftist magazine. In fact, Yön was more than a publication in that its contributors represented a political movement in the 1960s, Yön movement, which was a successor of another leftist-Kemalist movement of the 1930s, Kadro movement, which appeared also around a publication, Kadro.

History and profile
Yön started publication in Ankara on 20 December 1961. The founders included Doğan Avcıoğlu, Mümtaz Soysal, İlhan Selçuk and İlhami Soysal. Avcıoğlu was also the editor of Yön. The first issue of the magazine contained a declaration of 500 Turkish intellectuals about a formal doctrine of socialism.

Yön was an organ of Doğan Avcıoğlu's movement, namely direction-revolution movement, which is one of the most influential leftist movements between 1961 and 1971 in Turkey. In line with this function the magazine had a social democratic and Kemalist stance. For the magazine editors Turkey was a semi-feudal and semi-colonial country which was dependent on the western countries, particularly the United States. Therefore, the magazine supported antifeudalism and Third Worldist approach. It attempted to establish a national front to achieve national democracy in Turkey. Yön paid attention to the collaboration between the working class and progressive state bureaucracy in this endeavour. 

Major contributors included Niyazi Berkes, Sadun Aren, Şevket Süreyya Aydemir, Cahit Tanyol, İdris Küçükömer and Fethi Naci. Another significant contributor was Kemal Kurdaş who was the rector of Middle East Technical University. His articles contained bitter criticisms of capitalism and offered a model for Turkish-type socialism. Turhan Selçuk published political cartoons in Yön which published articles on the topics that were taboo in Turkey in the 1960s. One of these topics was the Kurdish issue in Turkey for which the magazine employed the term the Eastern problem. 

In addition to political writings, Yön also covered artistic work, including a poem of Nazım Hikmet (published in 1964) whose works had not been published in the country for a long time. In 1964 Mihri Belli, another influential figure, joined Yön. His contributions affected the political stance of the magazine in that Yön began to become closer to the right-wing views and to support the Republican Peasants' Nation Party which had been headed by Alparslan Türkeş, one of the army officers who involved in the military coup on 27 May 1960.

Yön was closed following its 77th issue published on 5 June 1963 due to the allegations of supporting the failed military coup by an army officer, Talat Aydemir, on 21 May 1963. The weekly was restarted after fifteen months on 25 September 1964.

Immediately after its foundation Yön sold 30,000 copies. The magazine was the most popular publication during its lifetime among the university students and faculty members from different universities. However, the circulation of Yön decreased to between 4,000 and 5,000 copies in 1965. The magazine ceased publication in 1967, and the last issue was published on 30 June 1967. In fact, it was closed down by Doğan Avcıoğlu who declared that Yön reached its target. During its lifetime the magazine produced a total of 222 issues.

The closure of the magazine, in fact, reflected a significant change in the ideology of the direction-revolution movement. Yön was followed by Ant and Türk Solu, two political magazines.

References

1961 establishments in Turkey
1967 disestablishments in Turkey
Defunct political magazines published in Turkey
Kemalism
Magazines established in 1961
Magazines disestablished in 1967
Magazines published in Ankara
Socialist magazines
Turkish-language magazines
Weekly magazines published in Turkey